On 18 September 2022, a small but significant and fatal tornado outbreak began in Eastern Ukraine and moved into Russia, producing at least 8 tornadoes, including an intense F3 tornado and three possible, unconfirmed tornadoes. On September 19, a significant tornado occurred in Russia, with another possible, unconfirmed tornado and severe straight-line thunderstorm wind damage. Through the event, 3 people were killed and at least 8 others were injured.

Meteorological history

On September 18, thunderstorms developed over northwest Ukraine. The environment the storms began to move into had strong low-level wind shear, which is needed for severe wind gusts and tornadoes. On September 19, Tomas Pucik, a researcher for the European Severe Storms Laboratory, noted the environment on the 18th was “very conductive” for tornadoes.

Tornadoes

Possible tornadoes
Around 13:00 ± 30 minutes UTC on September 18, severe wind damage occurred in the town of Sulimy and minutes later in the town of Konovaly, Ukraine. Power lines were damaged or destroyed, the roofs of 25 homes were damaged or destroyed, and trees sustained damage or were snapped or uprooted. The European Severe Storms Laboratory (ESSL) noted these events may have been tornadoes. As such, both were given a rating of F1 on the Fujita scale. However, a tornado was not confirmed in either event.

Just over an hour later, around 14:20 ± 30 minutes UTC, at least 13 households (6 in particular) were damaged in Tyazhino, Kursk, Russia after the passage of a thunderstorm. The structures suffered mostly damage to roofs with a few roofs being completely destroyed. The European Severe Storms Laboratory noted this event may have been a tornado. As such, it was given a rating of at least F1/T3, however a tornado was not confirmed with this event.

Around 15:15 ± 5 minutes UTC on September 19, wind damage to roofs in particular, was reported in Khokhlovshchina, Kirov, Russia, after the passage of a thunderstorm. The European Severe Storms Laboratory noted this event may have been a tornado. As such, ESSL gave a rating of F1 to the damage, however, a tornado was not confirmed with this event.

See also
 Weather of 2022
 Tornadoes of 2022
 1984 Soviet Union tornado outbreak
 2009 Krasnozavodsk tornado
 1904 Moscow tornado
 List of European tornadoes and tornado outbreaks

References

2022 meteorology
Tornadoes of 2022
2022 disasters in Russia
2022 disasters in Europe
September 2022 events in Russia
September 2022 events in Ukraine
Tornado outbreaks
F2 tornadoes
F3 tornadoes
Tornadoes in Russia
Tornadoes in Ukraine